Disco-interacting protein 2 homolog A is a protein that in humans is encoded by the DIP2A gene.

Model organisms
Model organisms have been used in the study of DIP2A function. A conditional knockout mouse line called Dip2atm2b(KOMP)Wtsi was generated at the Wellcome Trust Sanger Institute. Male and female animals underwent a standardized phenotypic screen to determine the effects of deletions. Additional screens performed: - In-depth immunological phenotyping

See also 
 DIP2B
 DIP2C

References

Further reading